The Acadia Night Sky Festival is an annual celebration of the starlit skies above Acadia National Park on Maine's Mount Desert Island and the Schoodic Peninsula. The festival takes place every September.

Hosted by the Bar Harbor Chamber of Commerce and other local organizations, the festival attracts speakers, researchers, photographers, and artists to the area, in addition to dozens of workshops.

References

External links 
 Acadia Night Sky Festival

Acadia National Park
Mount Desert Island